Captain Thomas Francis Swinford (9 May 1839 – 23 January 1915) was an English army officer and cricketer who played in four first-class cricket in 1874. Born at Minster-in-Thanet near Ramsgate in Kent, Swinford was a right-handed batsman.

Educated at Blackheath Proprietary School, Swinford played his first-class matches for Kent County Cricket Club. His debut was against Derbyshire. He was described in his Wisden obituary as a "good batsman and long-stop" who had made a half-century against Lancashire.

He served as a captain in the 98th Regiment. He died at Polegate near Eastbourne in Sussex in January 1915 aged 75.

References

External links

1839 births
1915 deaths
People from Minster-in-Thanet
People educated at Blackheath Proprietary School
English cricketers
Kent cricketers
98th Regiment of Foot officers
People from Polegate